Line of Demarcation is a 1966 war drama film written and directed by Claude Chabrol. Its title in French is La Ligne de démarcation. It is based on upon the memoir Mémoires d'un agent secret de la France libre et La Ligne de démarcation by Gilbert Renault under his pseudonym Colonel Rémy.

Plot
A small village in the Jura is split by the river Loue which creates the line of demarcation between Nazi occupied France and freedom.  A French officer, Pierre (Ronet), is released by the Nazi soldiers to find his chateau converted into a German command centre.   Whilst he is obliged to co-operate with the enemy, his wife Mary (Seberg) supports the resistance movement and is willing to risk her life for it.  The Nazis step up their activity against the resistance, insisting that any who attempt to cross the line of demarcation will be shot.  When his wife is arrested, Pierre decides to switch his allegiance.  The movement is hindered by an informer and another man who pretends to help the resistance fighters but leads them to the Nazis and steals all their possessions.

Principal cast

Production
The film was shot in Dole, Jura, starting on January 31, 1966. The shooting lasted 7 weeks.

Availability
The film has been released on DVD.

References

External links 

1966 films
1966 drama films
French drama films
Films about the French Resistance
Films based on non-fiction books
Films directed by Claude Chabrol
Films set in 1941
Films shot in France
French World War II films
1960s French films